Physotrichia is a genus of flowering plants belonging to the family Apiaceae.

Its native range is Tanzania to Southern Tropical Africa.

Species:

Physotrichia atropurpurea 
Physotrichia heracleoides 
Physotrichia longiradiatum 
Physotrichia muriculata 
Physotrichia verdickii 
Physotrichia welwitschii

References

Apiaceae
Apiaceae genera